HMS Mohawk was a British Vigilant-class gunvessel launched in 1856.

History
HMS Mohawk was purchased by Horatio Nelson Lay, Inspector General of the Qing Dynasty Chinese Maritime Customs Service, on 20 September 1862, as part of an effort to bolster the Qing Dynasty naval force in response to the ongoing Taiping Rebellion. Thereafter she was renamed Pei King (also as Pekin), and became part of the Lay-Osborn Flotilla commanded by Sherard Osborn. She was put under the command of Hugh Burgoyne. Upon her arrival in China, the Qing government ordered the ship to be renamed as Chin T'ai.

Disagreements between the Qing government and Lay over the command of the Lay-Osborn Flotilla led to its disbandment in 1863, and Pekin returned to the United Kingdom. She was originally intended for sale, but an embargo on sales, due to the concurrent American Civil War and fear of the vessel joining the Confederate States Navy, prevented any sales. When the American Civil War ended in 1865, she, along with China and Tientsin, were sold in an auction to Egypt on 30 December 1865 for £20,500.

Citations

References

 
 
  and 
 

 

Vigilant-class gunvessels
1856 ships
Victorian-era gunboats of the United Kingdom
Naval ships of Imperial China
Naval ships of China
Gunboats of China